"November Five" is the sixth episode of the third series of the 1960s cult British spy-fi television series The Avengers, starring Patrick Macnee and Honor Blackman. It was first broadcast by ABC on 2 November 1963. The episode was directed by Bill Bain and written by Eric Paice.

Plot
Newly elected Member of Parliament, Michael Dyter, fakes his own death only to reappear later in possession of a nuclear bomb which he threatens to detonate on 5 November, in London. Steed and Cathy go into politics, during a race against time to hunt him down.

Cast
 Patrick Macnee as John Steed
 Honor Blackman as Cathy Gale 
 Ruth Dunning as Mrs. Ellen Dove 
 David Davies as Arthur Dove 
 Ric Hutton as Mark St. John 
 David Langton as Major Gavin Swinburne 
 Iris Russell as Fiona 
 Gary Hope as Michael Osborne Dyter 
 Joe Robinson as Max
 Aimée Delamain as 1st Lady
 John Murray Scott as Returning Officer
 Frank Maher as Farmer

References

External links

Episode overview on The Avengers Forever! website

The Avengers (season 3) episodes
1963 British television episodes